Teleclita strigata is a moth of the family Notodontidae first described by Frederic Moore in 1879.

Distribution
It is found in Nepal, India, Thailand, Malaysia, Sri Lanka and Vietnam.

Biology
The larvae has been recorded on Terminalia species.

References

Notodontidae